National Pingtung University (NPTU) is a public university in Pingtung City, Pingtung County, Taiwan.

NPU offers undergraduate, graduate, and doctoral programs across 5 colleges: Agriculture, Life Sciences, Veterinary Medicine, Social Sciences, and Humanities and Management. Some of the popular programs include Agriculture, Food Science, Environmental Biology and Fisheries, and Tropical Medicine.

History
The university was established by the merging of National Pingtung University of Education and the National Pingtung Institute of Commerce on 1 August 2014.

Campus
 Minsheng Campus
 Pingshih Campus
 Pingshang Campus
 Checheng Campus

Academics
NPTU has five colleges: Computer Science, Education, Liberal Arts and Sciences, Management, and Science.

Transportation
The Minsheng Campus and Pingshang Campus are accessible within walking distance from Guilai Station of Taiwan Railways and the Linsen Campus is accessible within walking distance from Zhutian Station of Taiwan Railways.

See also
 List of universities in Taiwan

References

External links

2014 establishments in Taiwan
Universities and colleges in Pingtung County
Universities established in the 21st century
Educational institutions established in 2014
Universities and colleges in Taiwan
Technical universities and colleges in Taiwan